Aisam-ul-Haq Qureshi and Jean-Julien Rojer were the defending champions, but chose not to participate together. Qureshi played alongside Rohan Bopanna, but lost in the second round to Juan Sebastián Cabal and Robert Farah.  Rojer teamed up with Horia Tecău, but lost in the first round to Julien Benneteau and Édouard Roger-Vasselin.
Bob and Mike Bryan won the title, defeating Juan Sebastián Cabal and Robert Farah in the final, 7–6(10–8), 6–4.

Seeds

Draw

Finals

Top half

Bottom half

References
General

Specific

Sony Open Tennis - Doubles
2014 Sony Open Tennis
Men in Florida